This is a list of the mayors of the City of Glen Eira, a local government area in Melbourne, Australia. The City of Glen Eira was formed in 1994 with the amalgamation of the City of Caulfield and parts of the City of Moorabbin Victoria, Australia.

Mayors (1996 to present)

Deputy mayors (2006 to present)

See also
 City of Glen Eira
 Glen Eira Town Hall
 List of town halls in Melbourne
 Local government areas of Victoria

External links
Glen Eira City Council

Glen Eira
Mayors Glen Eira
City of Glen Eira